Erbium boride may refer to:

 Erbium tetraboride, ErB4
 Erbium hexaboride, ErB6